Ken Steven Angeles Chan (born January 17, 1993) is a Filipino-Chinese actor, model, television presenter, host, vlogger, and entrepreneur. Chan's showbiz career was established as a co-host and performer of German Moreno's Walang Tulugan with the Master Showman. He rose to fame through his role as Joey Vergara, Jr. and Destiny Rose Flores-Antonioni in the award-winning TV-series Destiny Rose. In 2017, he again experienced a peak in his career as he starred in Meant to Be alongside Barbie Forteza, together with Jak Roberto, Ivan Dorschner, and Addy Raj. Chan is widely known for the portrayal of his character, Boyet Villaroman, an autistic person alongside his loveteam partner, Rita Daniela, in the romantic-drama series My Special Tatay. He is also dubbed as "The Kapuso Ultimate Actor".

Life and career

1993–2010: Early life and career beginnings
Chan started having interest in theatre during his time in high school at Colegio San Agustin-Biñan. 

He was taking up tourism at De La Salle–College of Saint Benilde when he joined show business in the first quarter of 2011. Chan's former manager (Rams David) discovered him. Prior to joining show business, Chan already did some television commercials and appeared in a youth magazine. He also took the Hotel and Restaurant Management course as he explicitly admit in Sarap Diva when he guested. He also mostly got his villain roles.

2011–2016: Breakthrough
Chan was a host of the late night show, Walang Tulugan with the Master Showman with his colleagues Jake Vargas, Sanya Lopez, and Teejay Marquez. He already appeared in several shows of GMA Network in a span of one year. Chan appeared as part of the love triangle between Barbie Forteza and Joshua Dionisio's tandem in Tween Hearts.

Chan also portrayed a villain in Time of My Life as part of LJ Reyes group. he continues to share his talent in acting. He is paired with Yassi Pressman and sometimes, to Joyce Ching. Chan has a physical resemblance to his GMA namesake contract artist Steven Silva, who also has Chinese blood.

Chan gained fame in 2015 for playing the titular role of the novelist transwoman, Destiny Rose.

In 2017, he became the host of GMA News TV entertainment show, Day Off together with Janine Gutierrez.

2017–present: Career resurgence
Chan's fame has skyrocketed when he portrayed Yuan Lee in Meant to Be, Joshua Lazaro, a doctor in The Cure and Robert "Boyet" Mariano, a young man with mild intellectual disability in My Special Tatay. 

On January 8, 2019, he signed a recording contract with GMA Music. 

He later reunites with his My Special Tatay leading lady, Rita Daniela in rom-com One of the Baes (2019), and Ang Dalawang Ikaw (2021), where he portrayed a man living with dissociative identity disorder named Nelson Sarmiento.

Chan also became the co-host of singing competition The Clash from its second season until its fourth season, and is currently serving as one of the main hosts and performers in variety show All-Out Sundays.

Business 
Chan opened a first ever all-year-round Christmas-themed café called Café Claus on December 27, 2021, two days after the Christmas day.

Filmography

Television dramas

Television shows

Movies

Discography

Singles

Albums

Concerts 

 My Destiny: Ken Chan Live in Concert (2016)
 My Special Love: #BoBreyinConcert (2019)

Awards

Notes

References

External links
 
 Sparkle profile
 

1993 births
Living people
Filipino actors of Chinese descent
Filipino male television actors
Filipino television personalities
Filipino television presenters
Filipino television variety show hosts
GMA Network personalities
PolyEast Records artists
GMA Music artists
De La Salle–College of Saint Benilde alumni
Male actors from Qingdao
People from Biñan
Filipino photographers
Filipino male film actors
Tagalog people
21st-century Filipino businesspeople